"Someone Saved My Life Tonight" is a song, with music by English musician Elton John and lyrics by Bernie Taupin, from John's 1975 album Captain Fantastic and the Brown Dirt Cowboy. It was released as a single on 23 June 1975, the only single released from the album. Like the rest of the album, the song is autobiographical; it tells the story of an attempted suicide by John.

At 6 minutes and 45 seconds, it was long for a single, but owing to the highly personal nature of the lyrics, John refused to let it be cut down to a more typical single length. Despite the length it peaked on the US Billboard Hot 100 chart at No. 4 and in Canada on the RPM Top Singles chart at No. 2. It would be his last single for eight years to feature the original Elton John Band of John, Dee Murray, Davey Johnstone, and Nigel Olsson, as John fired Murray and Olsson following the recording of the album.

Background
The song concludes side one of the album's narrative, chronicling the early history of John and lyricist, Bernie Taupin, and their struggles to find their place within the music industry. When released as the album's only single in 1975, it reached No. 4 on The US Billboard Hot 100 singles chart, and entered the top 25 on the UK Singles Chart. In the U.S., it was certified Gold on 10 September 1975 by the RIAA. In Canada, the single narrowly missed being his ninth number one, hitting No. 2 on the RPM 100 national Top Singles chart on 30 August.

Taupin's lyric refers to a time in 1968, before John was popular as a musician, when John was engaged to be married to girlfriend Linda Woodrow. John and Woodrow were sharing a flat with Taupin in Furlong Road in Highbury, London, hence the opening line "When I think of those East End lights."   John did not love his girlfriend, and felt trapped by the relationship.  Feeling desperate, John contemplated suicide, and even made a half-hearted attempt at asphyxiating himself with a gas oven in his home. He took refuge in his friends, especially Long John Baldry, who convinced John to abandon his plans to marry, in order to salvage and maintain his musical career.  His parents arrived the next day, in a van, to take him home. As a sign of respect and gratitude to Baldry, Taupin wrote him into the song as the "someone" in the title, and also as "Sugar Bear".

According to Taupin in the documentary Two Rooms, about the professional and personal relationship between him and John, he was the one who found John. John had turned on the gas oven and had laid down on the floor, next to it. But, he had also opened the kitchen window, rendering the attempt ineffective.

The lyric "And butterflies are free to fly" is a reference to a famous quote from Dickens' Bleak House: "I only ask to be free. The butterflies are free. Mankind will surely not deny to Harold Skimpole what it concedes to the butterflies." A few years prior to the song's release, the same quotation had inspired the title of the 1972 American comedy-drama film Butterflies Are Free, an adaptation of the 1969 play of the same title by Leonard Gershe.

Reception
Cash Box said that "Tschaikovsky would feel proud about Elton's punctuated chords — those high harmonies are perfect for summertime." Record World said that it's "the most ambitious cut" from the album and that the "performance advances the level of elegance that made his 'Your Song' ours."

Comparisons were drawn to the earlier John/Taupin composition "Skyline Pigeon", as both songs contain the metaphor of a creature flying free towards the sky to signify escape from marriage, with the creature in this case being a butterfly.

Some radio stations altered the song or refused to play it due to the use of the phrase "Damn it" in the second verse.

In the liner notes to the Deluxe Edition of Captain Fantastic and The Brown Dirt Cowboy, writer Paul Gambaccini related a recollection from producer Gus Dudgeon. During the recording of the song's lead vocal, Dudgeon said he was pushing John for more in terms of his delivery of the vocal, not paying attention to the lyric. According to Gambaccini, guitarist Davey Johnstone leaned over and told Dudgeon, "You know he's singing about killing himself." Dudgeon was apparently mortified by the revelation and relented.

At 6:45 this was one of John's longest singles and was supposed to be edited to a shorter version for radio consumption. However, John refused to let MCA Records cut it down, saying that it was to be released as a whole, and the record company acquiesced. Its B-Side song, "House of Cards", was recorded by UK singer Linda Kendrick.

John has played the song live many times from its release until 1986, and again from 1995 to present. Two of the best known recorded performances coming during the Central Park concert in September 1980 and his visit in Rio de Janeiro in November 1995 during the final leg of Made in England Tour.

Chart performance

Weekly singles charts

Year-end charts

Certifications

Personnel
 Elton John – piano, Rhodes piano, ARP String Ensemble synthesizer, vocals
 Davey Johnstone – Leslied electric guitar, acoustic guitar, backing vocals
 Dee Murray – bass guitar, backing vocals
 Nigel Olsson – drums, backing vocals
 Ray Cooper – tambourine, shaker, cymbal

Popular culture

Walter Jackson recorded a version of the song for his 1976 album Feeling Good.

Mariah Carey used an interpolation of the song in a house record she co-wrote with David Morales titled "Fly Away (Butterfly Reprise)" which appears on her album Butterfly.

Sheryl Crow alludes to the lyrics of the song in "Always on Your Side" (a song on her 2005 album Wildflower) with the lyric "If butterflies are free to fly, why do they fly away?"

Kanye West sampled the song for "Good Morning," a song on his 2007 album Graduation.

This song is referenced frequently by Father Callahan in Stephen King's book Wolves of the Calla and is referenced several more times through the course of The Dark Tower series.

This song is featured in the trailer for the 2002 film Moonlight Mile directed by Brad Silberling, starring Susan Sarandon, Dustin Hoffman and Jake Gyllenhaal. The film is partially based on Silberling dealing with the aftermath of the murder of his girlfriend, actress Rebecca Schaeffer.

Axl Rose covered parts of the song on his piano as an intro to "November Rain" during the 2009–2010 Chinese Democracy World Tour.

The comedy film Hamlet 2 features the song, sung by a gay men's chorus, within the titular play.  The song was covered by The Ralph Sall Experience for the 2008 film.

In the Simpsons episode "I'm with Cupid", which features Elton John playing himself, Apu irritates John by deliberately punning that "Someone saved your life tonight" after his quick response prevents the singer being struck by a crashing plane.

"Someone Saved My Life Tonight" was also well known among die-hard Elton John fans for its flip-side, "House of Cards," a track recorded along with the album's other songs, but left off the final edit of the album. As far as anyone knows, it could well be the album's only recorded outtake. (A Taupin lyric for "Dogs in the Kitchen" was included with the original LP and Deluxe Edition CD issue Lyric booklet, but it is unknown whether the song was ever finished with music and recorded.) "House of Cards," meanwhile, was a long-awaited track on CD, finally surfacing on Rare Masters, though left off the remastered CD re-release of Captain Fantastic in 1995. It was, however, included on the Deluxe Edition re-release as one of the bonus tracks, finally joining the album with which it was originally recorded.

The song is also referenced in the novel You by Caroline Kepnes.

Folk rock band Mumford & Sons covered the song for the 2018 tribute album Revamp: Reimagining the Songs of Elton John & Bernie Taupin.

References

External links
 The Furlong Road Flat
 Linda Woodrow Engaged to Elton John (Sunday Mirror October 16 2005)

Elton John songs
1975 singles
Songs about suicide
Songs with music by Elton John
Songs with lyrics by Bernie Taupin
Song recordings produced by Gus Dudgeon
1975 songs
MCA Records singles
DJM Records singles
Cashbox number-one singles